Sulfafurazole (INN, also known as sulfisoxazole) is a sulfonamide antibacterial with an dimethyl-isoxazole substituent. It possesses antibiotic activity against a wide range of Gram-negative and Gram-positive organisms.  It is sometimes given in combination with erythromycin (see erythromycin/Sulfafurazole) or phenazopyridine. It is used locally in a 4% solution or ointment.

See also
 Sulfamethoxazole
 Sulfapyridine

References

External links
 
 
 
 

Sulfonamide antibiotics
Isoxazoles